"Audience of One" is a song by American rock band Rise Against, written by the band's frontman Tim McIlrath. It is the second single from their 2008 album Appeal to Reason. Hitting number four on the Billboard Alternative Songs chart, "Audience of One" is Rise Against's third-highest charting single, behind the previous single from Appeal to Reason, "Re-Education (Through Labor)", which peaked at number three and the third single "Savior".

Performance
In mid-October 2008, the L.A. radio station KROQ began playing "Audience of One." Its video was announced to be shot with director Brett Simon on December 9. On January 15, 2009, the video for "Audience of One" premiered on MySpace. The song impacted radio on January 20. The single was released on CD and 7" vinyl on March 3, 2009, in the UK.

Music video
The music video features an eight-year-old boy who resembles George W. Bush playing with a miniature world, and throughout the video the boy plays with objects depicting high gas prices, the war in Iraq, the funeral of a soldier, Abu Ghraib prison, the devastation of Hurricane Katrina, deforestation, house foreclosures, gay marriage, and illegal immigration before going to bed in the White House. It also features Rise Against performing in a miniature White House lawn, which the boy smashes before the end of the video.

Other appearances
"Audience of One" is featured with a customized Rise Against Theme in Tap Tap Revenge 2 for the iPhone and iPod Touch. It is featured again in the aforementioned game's sequel, Tap Tap Revenge 3, in a double pack that also includes “Ready to Fall”.
The song is also a downloadable song in Guitar Hero World Tour and Rock Band 3.

Track listing

Charts

See also
 List of anti-war songs

References

External links

Rise Against songs
2008 songs
2009 singles
Music videos directed by Brett Simon
Songs written by Tim McIlrath
Songs written by Joe Principe
Songs written by Zach Blair
Songs written by Brandon Barnes
Rock ballads
Interscope Records singles

American alternative rock songs